Hum is a 1991 Indian Hindi-language action crime film directed by Mukul S. Anand. It stars Amitabh Bachchan, Rajinikanth, Govinda, Kimi Katkar, Deepa Sahi, Shilpa Shirodkar, Danny Denzongpa, Anupam Kher and Kader Khan. This was the most successful film for the famous super star Bachchan in the early '90s before he announced his temporary retirement (for five years) immediately after its release. At the 37th Filmfare Awards, the film received 7 nominations and won 4 awards including Best Actor for Bachchan and Best Choreographer for Chinni Prakash for the song "Jumma Chumma De De". The film was the fourth highest-grossing Indian film of 1991 at the box office.

Plot 

Bhaktawar (Danny Denzongpa) rules over the docks in Mumbai, treating his workers like slaves. Despite his general dissatisfaction with this regime, Tiger (Amitabh Bachchan) extorts money from the dock workers for his father Pratap (Deepak Shirke), who in turn works as an enforcer for Bhaktawar.

Tiger is in love with his best friend Gonsalves (Romesh Sharma)'s sister Jumma (Kimi Katkar). Gonsalves is against Bhaktawar's policies and is killed by Bhaktawar and in the subsequent fall-out, Tiger's father and stepmother also die, leaving two young half-brothers, Kumar and Vijay, with Tiger.

Tiger immediately sets out to kill Bhaktawar but is stopped by Inspector Girdhar (Anupam Kher). Girdhar reminds Tiger to fulfil his dying stepmother's wish and take care of his brothers while leaving the police to deal with Bhaktawar. Girdhar and his faithful sidekick Havaldar Arjun Singh (Annu Kapoor) steal money from Bhaktawar's safe and set fire to Bhaktawar's house to destroy any evidence, murdering Bhaktawar's wife and his daughter. Police later arrest Bhaktawar for killing Tiger's family and sends him to jail. Tiger escapes in a train and Jumma refuses to leave with Tiger, as his brothers should be his priority. Jumma and Tiger promise to reunite in the future. Girdhar bombs the train carrying Tiger and his brothers to eliminate any possible witnesses of his crime, but they escape.

Years later, Tiger has renamed himself Shekhar and is a respectable farmer and timber merchant in Ooty. Kumar (Rajnikanth) is a police officer married to Aarti (Deepa Sahi), and they have a young daughter Jyoti (Sanjana). The youngest brother, Vijay (Govinda), is a college student. Vijay is in love with Anita (Shilpa Shirodkar), daughter of General Rana Pratap Singh (Kader Khan), who wants his daughter to marry a military officer. Shekhar and his brothers lead a happy family life. Neither of the two youngest brothers seems to have any memory of their time in Mumbai and both regard Shekhar as their elder brother. Jumma is now a successful actress, while Girdhar and Havaldar are leading a luxurious life off the money they stole from Bhaktawar.

Bhaktawar is released from jail and is manipulated by Giridhar into believing that Tiger killed Bhaktawar's family. To seek revenge, Bhaktawar tracks down Tiger in Ooty. He kidnaps Aarti and Jyothi in Bangalore and tells them the truth about Shekhar. Meanwhile, Kumar also learns Shekhar's true identity and blames him for his wife and child's kidnapping. However, all misunderstandings are cleared by Jumma when she explains Vijay and Kumar about their past and the sacrifices made by Shekhar for them to lead a respectable life.

Later Tiger, along with Kumar and Vijay, rescue Aarti and Jyoti and explain to Bhaktawar that it was Giridhar who had murdered his family. Bhaktawar then ties himself along with Giridhar to a bomb and they both die due to the explosion. The film ends with the family happily united.

Cast 
 Amitabh Bachchan as Shekhar Malhotra / Tiger
 Rajinikanth as Inspector Kumar Malhotra
 Govinda as Vijay Malhotra
 Kimi Katkar as Jumalina Gonsalves 'Jumma'
 Deepa Sahi as Aarti Malhotra (Kumar's wife)
 Shilpa Shirodkar as Anita Sinha
 Sanjana as Jyoti Malhotra (Kumar's Daughter)
 Danny Denzongpa as Bhaktavar
 Anupam Kher as Inspector Girdhar
 Kader Khan as General Chittori Pratap Sinha / Satrangi
 Romesh Sharma as Gonsalves (Tiger's Friend / Jumma's Brother)
 Annu Kapoor as Havaldar Arjun Singh
 Deepak Shirke as Pratap (Tiger's Father)
 Shiva Rindani as Captain Zatach (Captain Attack)
 Guddi Maruti as Tomatoes Seller
 Viju Khote as a College Principal
 Shammi as Aarti's Mother
 Asha Sharma as Tiger's Stepmother
 Aparajita Bhushan as Bhaktawar's wife (Uncredited)

Production 
Hum was shot in various locations including Mumbai, Ooty, and Mauritius. Mukul S. Anand had considered and discussed a potential scene for this film with Rajinikanth, where Amitabh Bachchan's character would help Govinda get a seat in the Police Academy. Anand discarded the scene, because he did not find it suitable. But Rajinikanth felt the scene had the potential to develop into a script for a possible feature film, which resulted into the 1995 Tamil film Baashha.

In 1990 at Wembley stadium London, Amitabh Bachchan performed and danced to the song "Jumma Chumma De De" with Sridevi even before the film and song were released.

Soundtrack 

The soundtrack was composed by Laxmikant–Pyarelal. Two songs were inspired by Guinean singer Mory Kanté's 1987 album Akwaba Beach, with "Jumma Chumma De De" being based on Kante's "Tama", while "Ek Doosre Se" was based on Kanté's "Inch Allah".

Lyrics are written by Anand Bakshi.

The film's soundtrack album sold 3million units. However, the music rights were sold for only .

Box office 
The film grossed  in India, including a net income of 9.25crore. It was the year's fourth highest-grossing film at the Indian box office.

Accolades

References

External links 
 

1991 films
1990s Hindi-language films
Indian crime action films
1990s crime action films
Films directed by Mukul S. Anand
Films scored by Laxmikant–Pyarelal
Films shot in Ooty
Fictional portrayals of the Maharashtra Police
Films set in Tamil Nadu